Secusio discoidalis is a moth in the subfamily Arctiinae. It was described by George Talbot in 1929. It is found in Angola, the Democratic Republic of the Congo, Somalia and South Africa. The species host plants have yet to be discovered.

References

Moths described in 1929
Arctiini